Dobrodol may refer to:

 Dobrodol (Irig), a village in Syrmia, Serbia
 Dobrodol, Croatia, a village near Zagreb, Croatia

See also
 Dobri Do (disambiguation)
 Dobri dol (disambiguation)

Serbo-Croatian place names